Highgate is an area of Birmingham, England. Following the Big City Plan of February 2008, Highgate is now a district of Birmingham City Centre. This area is regarded as the site of the original Anglo-Saxon settlement which gave the city of Birmingham its name.

Birmingham Central Mosque is one of Highgate's most distinctive buildings. The area mainly consists of commercial premises and modern council-owned residential properties.  Older buildings include Stratford House, the Church of St. Alban the Martyr and the large Victorian houses opposite Highgate Park.

Highgate is also home to the Birmingham Sports Centre and Joseph Chamberlain Sixth Form College, both of which are being redeveloped. Birmingham Sports Centre is to be demolished and a new Joseph Chamberlain Sixth Form College is being constructed at Haden Circus.

Local amenities include an array of small shops, around Gooch Street.

Nearby areas include Lee Bank, Balsall Heath, Edgbaston and Sparkbrook.

History
Most of Highgate was built after 1850 and by 1900 had a population of about 15,000.  The local community is now very mixed due to successive waves of immigration, primarily from the Commonwealth.

Highgate had a large Bangladeshi population prior to its redevelopment in the 1970s. Many were from the rural area of Sylhet and had arrived in the late 1950s and early 1960s. They settled in Highgate because its property, being of a very poor standard, was cheap. However, in 1971, a survey for the Race Relations Institute found that few of them wanted to move. One account of the time says:

Because of the overcrowding, my uncle and Abdul Jabbar bought the next door house. Soon the situation returned with a population of twenty or so in the two houses. Admittedly our houses were not always up to standard. We were all men, all working in heavy industry and all working overtime. When we came home we were already tired but had to do our cooking and cleaning. It was still "Home, Sweet Home" to us.

Geography
Elevation

The land rises to the east, reaching  at the Highgate Middleway south of Leopold Street.

Transport

Highgate Middleway (A4540) links Camp Hill Circus and Haden Circus. Until 1851 there was a toll gate across Stratford Road, known as the Balsall Heath Gate.  It was owned by the Alcester Turnpike Trust which had been founded in 1767 to maintain the road.

Some of Highgate's streets were named after the local Vaughton family. Dymoke Street was named after Mary Ann Dymoke, wife of Robert Vaughton. Emily Street was named after their daughter-in-law.

Vaughton Street was built in the 1860s, nearly 1600 people lived there by 1881.  It originally consisted of back-to-back houses, with outside toilets and water taps. In 1938 the Council demolished these houses and built St. Martin's Flats. They were built using concrete because it was cheap, however it made them inherently damp. The flats quickly deteriorated and they were eventually knocked down in 1980.  Private houses were built on the site in 1987.

Stanhope Street was called Ryland Street up to 1881. Louisa Ryland was a member of one of the wealthiest families of Birmingham, and owned a lot of land in Birmingham, including parts of Highgate.

Highgate Park

Highgate Park stands on land that was originally owned by Elizabeth Hollier, who used it for grazing. When Elizabeth died her will stated that the land was to be used for charity. The four fields were to be rented out, and twelve poor people of Aston Parish and twelve poor people of Birmingham Parish were to be clothed with the money each year. In 1875, the Trustees of Elizabeth Hollier's Charity wanted to develop the land for industry, but Birmingham Corporation bought it for a park. The part of the park near Alcester Street was later asphalted to serve as a playground. Highgate Park was home to Birmingham's King Edward VII Memorial from 1951 until its relocation to Centenary Square in 2010.

Alongside the park, is the 'Paragon Hotel'. This was originally a Rowton House for single working men. It is now attracting business people attending the many conventions in Birmingham and tourists visiting the city.

Stratford House

Stratford House, a Grade II* listed building dating from 1601, is located near Camp Hill traffic island.

Schools in the area

Ark St Alban's Academy
Calthorpe Special School
Chandos Primary School
Percy Shurmer Academy
St Anne's Primary School

St Alban’s Church and School
James Samuel Pollock and his brother Thomas Benson Pollock were Anglo-Catholics who built a combined church and school in Leopold Street, in 1865.  The original church building was used as a boys' school after it was replaced by the existing St Alban the Martyr church in 1881. A girls' school was also set up in Dymoke Street.

Notable people from Highgate
Edward White Benson, an Archbishop of Canterbury
William Mosedale, George Cross recipient

References

External links
Highgate

Areas of Birmingham, West Midlands